WXMG may refer to:

 WXMG (FM), a radio station (95.5 FM) licensed to serve Lancaster, Ohio, United States
 WHTD (FM), a radio station (106.3 FM) licensed to serve London, Ohio, which held the call sign WXMG from 2011 to 2015
 WTOH, a radio station (98.9 FM) licensed to serve Upper Arlington, Ohio, which held the call sign WXMG from 1998 to 2011